Aygek is a village and a rural community in the Armavir Province of Armenia. It is located 8 km west of the capital Yerevan and 36 km east of the provincial centre Armavir. It has an elevation of 870 metres above sea level. The majority of the village are Armenian migrants from Iran.

The village is only 16 km away from the Armenian-Turkish border line.

See also 
Armavir Province

References

World Gazeteer: Armenia – World-Gazetteer.com

Populated places in Armavir Province
Populated places established in 1946
Cities and towns built in the Soviet Union
1946 establishments in the Soviet Union